Bedřich Procházka (4 July 1855 in Rakovník – 3 January 1934 in Prague) was a Czechoslovak mathematician. He was granted an honorary doctorate from the Czech Technical University in Prague in 1925.

References

1855 births
1934 deaths
People from Rakovník
People from the Kingdom of Bohemia
Czech mathematicians